'Assemblée communale (assembly of the commune) or assemblée primaire (primary assembly) is the name given today to the legislative power of certain communes of Switzerland. Every citizen is part of the assembly and may  participate in it simply by showing their  (ballot).

This structure is primarily seen in small communes, but can also be found in much larger communes in German-speaking areas of Switzerland. There, the electorate selects the representatives who make up the legislative body. The name of that body varies from one canton to another: 
town council: Canton of Jura
conseil général:  (Valais, Fribourg)
 (Vaud).

The Canton of Neuchâtel does not have communal assemblies. Its legislature, the Grand Council of Neuchâtel, has 115 seats distributed in proportion to the population of the six electoral constituencies:
Neuchâtel (35 seats)
Boudry (25)
Val-de-Travers (8)
Val-de-Ruz (10)
Le Locle (10)
La Chaux-de-Fonds (27).

Overview 

Legend:

Archaic: France
Immediately after the French Revolution and the overthrow of the monarchy and the Ancien Régime, the Assemblée législative decreed on August 10 1792 a convocation of electors to elect a national legislature. Another decree on August 12 mandated  to select the electors, thereby in effect implementing  universal male suffrage.

Notes

References

See also 
Insurrection of 10 August 1792
Landsgemeinde

Bibliography 
.

Cantonal legislatures of Switzerland
Legislatures of country subdivisions

 French Revolution
 Constituent assemblies
 1792 establishments in France
 Historical legislatures in France
Defunct unicameral legislatures